Gedeone Malagola (São Paulo, July 7th, 1924 - Jundiaí, September 15th, 2008) was a Brazilian comics artist and editor. He started his career in the 1940s, drawing for the newspaper A Marmita. He worked for several comic book publishers until he founded his own, Editora Júpiter. His main works were in the 1960s at GEP (Gráfica Editora Penteado), where he created the superheroes Raio Negro (his best-known character), Hydroman and Homem Lua. In the late 1960s, Malagola wrote unofficial stories of the X-Men for GEP (the publisher had the characters' rights in Brazil, but the licensed stories were not enough for the number of pages of the Brazilian magazine, so they asked their artists to create - without Marvel's authorization - stories to fill the space). In 1986, he was awarded the Prêmio Angelo Agostini for Master of National Comics, an award that aims to honor artists who have dedicated themselves to Brazilian comics for at least 25 years.

References 

Brazilian comics artists
Prêmio Angelo Agostini winners
Brazilian comics writers

1924 births
2008 deaths
Brazilian people of Italian descent